George Alexander Weatherill (23 May 1900 – 27 February 1986) was an Australian rules footballer who played in the VFL between 1919 and 1923 for the Richmond Football Club.

References

 Hogan P: The Tigers Of Old, Richmond FC, Melbourne 1996

External links

1900 births
1986 deaths
Richmond Football Club players
Richmond Football Club Premiership players
Australian rules footballers from Melbourne
One-time VFL/AFL Premiership players
People from Kew, Victoria